Debbie J. Johnson (born October 1, 1957) is a Minnesota, United States, politician and a former member of the Minnesota Senate who represented District 49, which includes portions of Anoka County in the northern Twin Cities metropolitan area. A Republican, she was first elected to the Senate in 2000, and was re-elected in 2002 and 2006. Prior to the 2002 redistricting, she represented the old District 50.

Johnson was a member of the Senate's Capital Investment Committee, the Commerce and Consumer Protection Committee, the Health, Housing and Family Security Committee, and the Taxes Committee. Her special legislative concerns included education, commerce, jobs, transportation, and taxes.

On February 13, 2010, Johnson lost her bid for endorsement to challenger Michelle Benson, also of Ham Lake, at the party's senate district convention. She later announced that she would not seek a fourth term.

Johnson is the parent of two children.

References

External links

Senator Johnson Web Page
Minnesota Public Radio Votetracker: Senator Debbie Johnson
Project Vote Smart - Senator Debbie Johnson Profile

1957 births
Living people
Republican Party Minnesota state senators
People from Ham Lake, Minnesota
Women state legislators in Minnesota
21st-century American politicians
21st-century American women politicians